Tobias Potye (born 16 March 1995 in Munich) is a German athlete specialising in the high jump. He won the gold medal at the 2013 European Junior Championships. At the European Athletics Championships of Munich he won a silver medal in high jump.

His personal bests in the event are 2.30 metres outdoors (Berlin 2022) and 2.27 metres indoors (Toruń 2023).

International competitions

References

1995 births
Living people
German male high jumpers
Sportspeople from Munich
20th-century German people
21st-century German people
European Athletics Championships medalists